Bothriomyrmex anastasiae is a species of ant in the genus Bothriomyrmex. Described by Dubovikov in 2002, the species is endemic to the Russian Federation.

References

Bothriomyrmex
Hymenoptera of Europe
Insects of Russia
Insects described in 2002